Raja Club Athletic (Arabic: نادي الرجاء الرياضي, romanized: Nādī ar-Rajāʾ ar-Riyāḍī) commonly referred to as Raja CA, is a professional sports club based in Casablanca, Morocco. Competing in Botola, Raja CA is one of only three clubs never to have been relegated from the top tier of Moroccan football. 

In domestic football, the club has won 20 trophies that includes 12 Botola titles and 8 Throne Cups. It is also one of the most successful clubs in the history of African football as it has achieved twelve international trophies by winning the CAF Champions League three times, the CAF Confederation Cup twice, the CAF Super Cup twice, the CAF Cup once, the Afro–Asian Club Championship once, the Arab Club Champions Cup twice and the North African Club Cup once. 

In 2000, Raja was ranked by CAF in the 3rd place of the best African clubs of the 20th century, after Al Ahly SC and Zamalek SC. Raja is also, with 18 official trophies, the most successful Moroccan club of the 21st century, and is the 4th most crowned club in Africa with 9 titles in official competitions.

This article contains historical and current trophies pertaining to the club throughout its history. For honours by season, see List of Raja CA seasons.

List of honours

National titles

Continental and intercontinental titles

Arab and regional titles

Friendly competitions

References

External links

Honours
Honours